Kentish Knock is a shoal off of Kent and Essex in England. It may also refer to:
 Battle of the Kentish Knock, fought in October 1652
 London Array, a wind farm near the Kentish Knock.
 Lightvessels in the United Kingdom, LV Kentish Knock was a lightship